In 1452 Borso d'Este, then Marquis of Modena and Reggio, was raised by Emperor Frederick III with the title of Duke of Modena and Reggio. In 1471, Pope Paul II formally elevated him in as Duke of Ferrara, over which the family had in fact long presided.

This latter territory was lost to the Papal States in 1597, while the House of Este continued to rule the Duchy of Modena and Reggio in the Emilia region until 1796, when it became part of Napoleon Bonaparte's Cispadane Republic. In 1814, the duchy was restored under the Habsburg grandson of the last Este duke, continuing until it was annexed by Piedmont-Sardinia in 1859.

From the Lordship of Este to the Duchy of Ferrara-Modena-Reggio

House of Este
The line of Marquesses of Este (Marchesi d'Este) rose in 1039 with Albert Azzo II, Margrave of Milan. The name "Este" is related to the city where the family came from, Este.

The family was founded by Adalbert the Margrave, who might have been the true first Margrave of Milan of this family. In 1209, Azzo VI was named the first Marquess of Ferrara. The title passed to his descendants, and the marquisate was delegated to a cadet branch of the Este family. Later, they were also created Marquesses of Modena and Reggio.

Partitions of Este territories under Este rule

Table of rulers

Habsburg-Este Dukes of Modena and Reggio, 1814–1859
(from 1815 also Duke of Mirandola and from 1829 Duke of Massa and Prince of Carrara)

Habsburg-Este Dukes of Modena and Reggio, post monarchy
 Francesco V (1859–1875)
 Francis Ferdinand, Archduke of Austria-Este (1875–1914)
 Charles, Archduke of Austria-Este (1914–1917)
 Robert, Archduke of Austria-Este (1917–1996)
 Lorenz, Archduke of Austria-Este (1996–present)
 Heir apparent: Prince Amedeo of Belgium, Archduke of Austria-Este

See also
 List of Modenese consorts
 List of Ferrarese consorts

References

Bibliography
  Cawley, Charles (2001), Medieval Lands - Foundation for Medieval Genealogy, Modena, Ferrara, fmg.ac

Ferrara and Modena

Lists of dukes